Rashmi Jayprakash Arya is an Indian politician, Social worker and incumbent Member of legislative assembly for Mauranipur constituency in Uttar Pradesh state of India. As a Bharatiya Janata Party supporter Apna Dal (S) member, She won the election of 2022 Uttar Pradesh legislative assembly election by defeating the Samajwadi party candidate Tilakchandra Ahirwar by 58595 votes. previously in 2012, She was a member of Samajwadi party and won 2012 Uttar Pradesh Legislative Assembly election by defeating the Bahujan Samaj Party candidate. Arya belong to the Koli caste of Uttar Pradesh.

References 

Living people
Yogi ministry
Year of birth missing (living people)
Uttar Pradesh MLAs 2012–2017
Uttar Pradesh MLAs 2022–2027
Bharatiya Janata Party politicians from Uttar Pradesh